Pillune (possibly from Aymara pillu crown or cord which some indigenous peoples use to tighten their hair, -ni a suffix to indicate ownership, "the one with a crown" or "the one with a pillu") is a mountain in the Huanzo mountain range in the Andes of Peru, about  high. It is situated in the Arequipa Region, La Unión Province, Puyca District. Pillune lies west of Ancojahua, northwest of  Quelcata and northeast of Chuañuma.

References

Mountains of Peru
Mountains of Arequipa Region